William Amey VC MM (5 March 1881 – 28 May 1940) was an English recipient of the Victoria Cross, the highest and most prestigious award for gallantry in the face of the enemy that can be awarded to British and Commonwealth forces.

Amey was 37 years old, and a lance-corporal in the 1/8th Battalion, The Royal Warwickshire Regiment, British Army during the First World War when the following deed took place for which he was awarded the VC.

On 4 November 1918 at Landrecies, France, when many hostile machine-gun nests were missed by the leading troops owing to fog, Lance-Corporal Amey led his section against a machine-gun nest under heavy fire and drove the garrison into a neighbouring farm, finally capturing 50 prisoners and several machine-guns. Later, single-handed and under heavy fire he attacked a machine-gun post in a farmhouse, killed two of the garrison and drove the remainder into a cellar until assistance arrived. Subsequently, he rushed a strongly held post, capturing 20 more prisoners.

Amey later achieved the rank of corporal, and was demobilised in 1919. He is buried at Leamington Cemetery, Brunswick Street, Leamington Spa, Warwickshire, England. His Victoria Cross is displayed at the Royal Regiment of Fusiliers Museum (Royal Warwickshire), in St John's House, Warwick, England.

References

Monuments to Courage (David Harvey, 1999)
The Register of the Victoria Cross (This England, 1997)
VCs of the First World War - The Final Days 1918 (Gerald Gliddon, 2000)

1881 births
1940 deaths
Military personnel from Birmingham, West Midlands
Royal Warwickshire Fusiliers soldiers
British Army personnel of World War I
British World War I recipients of the Victoria Cross
Recipients of the Military Medal
British Army recipients of the Victoria Cross